fa:صف پرش
In Computer Architecture, While Branch predictions Branch queue takes place. When Branch Predictor predicts if the branch is taken or not, Branch queue stores the predictions that to be used later.

Branch queue consists 2 values only. Taken or Not Taken.

Branch queue helps other algorithms to increase parallelism and optimization. It is not software implemented or Hardware one, It falls under hardware software co-design.

References

Computer architecture